Sinpo Station is a metro station on the Suin Line of the Seoul Metropolitan Subway system that opened on February 27, 2016. It is located in Hang-dong, Jung-gu, Incheon.

References

Metro stations in Incheon
Railway stations opened in 2016
Seoul Metropolitan Subway stations
Jung District, Incheon